Alexandre Grenier-Pokulok (born May 25, 1986 in Vaudreuil-Dorion, Québec) is a Canadian professional ice hockey defenceman currently playing for Bâtisseurs de Montcalm of the Ligue Nord-Américaine de Hockey.

Playing career
Pokulok played one season with the Notre Dame Hounds of the Saskatchewan Junior Hockey League. He spent two seasons with the Cornell Big Red of the ECAC Hockey League before signing an entry-level professional contract with the Capitals on July 6, 2006. Pokulok was drafted by the Washington Capitals 14th overall in the 2005 NHL Entry Draft.

On June 4, 2010, Pokulok left North America as a free agent and signed a one-year contract with German team, DEG Metro Stars of the DEL.

On July 5, 2012, Pokulok left Europe and signed a contract with Cornwall River Kings of the Ligue Nord-Américaine de Hockey. Pokulok skated with the River Kings over parts of four seasons, scoring 109 points in 119 games. While nursing a lower body injury, Pokulok was traded to the Saint-Georges Cool FM 103.5 on January 11, 2016 for utility player Maxime Vachon, a 2016 first round pick (1st overall), along with a 2016 fifth round pick (33rd overall). On August 31, 2022, Pokulok signed with Bâtisseurs de Montcalm, an LNAH expansion team, for their inaugural season.

Career statistics

Regular season and playoffs

International

Awards and honors

References

External links

1986 births
Athol Murray College of Notre Dame alumni
Bakersfield Condors (1998–2015) players
Canadian ice hockey defencemen
Cornell Big Red men's ice hockey players
Hershey Bears players
Ice hockey people from Quebec
KHL Medveščak Zagreb players
Living people
National Hockey League first-round draft picks
People from Vaudreuil-Dorion
San Antonio Rampage players
South Carolina Stingrays players
Springfield Falcons players
Washington Capitals draft picks
Canadian expatriate ice hockey players in Croatia